Caboloan (also spelled Kaboloan), referred to Chinese records as Feng-chia-hsi-lan, was a sovereign pre-colonial Philippine polity located in the fertile Agno River basin and delta, with Binalatongan as the capital. Places in Pangasinan like Lingayen Gulf were mentioned as early as 1225, when Lingayen as known as Li-ying-tung had been listed in Chao Ju-kua's Chu Fan Chih (An account of the various barbarians) as one of the trading places along with Mai (Mindoro or Manila). The polity of Pangasinan sent emissaries to China in 1406–1411. The emissaries reported 3 successive paramount leaders of Fengaschilan to the Chinese: Kamayin on 23 September 1406, Taymey ("Tortoise Shell") and Liyli in 1408 and 1409 and on 11
December 1411 the Emperor tendered the Pangasinan party a state banquet.

In the 16th century, the port settlement of Agoo in Pangasinan was called the "Port of Japan" by the Spanish. The locals wore apparel typical of other maritime Southeast Asian ethnic groups in addition to Japanese and Chinese silks. Even common people were clad in Chinese and Japanese cotton garments. They also blackened their teeth and were disgusted by the white teeth of foreigners, which were likened to that of animals. They used porcelain jars typical of Japanese and Chinese households. Japanese-style gunpowder weapons were also encountered in naval battles in the area. In exchange for these goods, traders from all over Asia would come to trade primarily for gold and slaves, but also for deerskins, civet and other local products. Other than a notably more extensive trade network with Japan and China, they were culturally similar to other Luzon groups to the south, especially the Kapampangans.

Limahong, a Chinese corsair and warlord, briefly invaded the polity after his failure in the Battle of Manila (1574). He then set up an enclave of wokou (Japanese and Chinese pirates) in Pangasinan. Nevertheless, the Mexico-born Juan de Salcedo and his force of Tagalog, Visayan and Latino soldiers then assaulted and destroyed the pirate-kingdom, and then incorporated the Pangasinan people and their polity into the Spanish East Indies of the Spanish Empire.

See also

Pangasinan
History of the Philippines
Pangasinan people
Cultural achievements of pre-colonial Philippines

Notes

Former countries in Southeast Asia
Former countries in Philippine history
Barangay states
History of the Philippines (900–1565)
History of Pangasinan